Environmental organizations consist of four major categories which are in direct reference from the Sacramento State's Environmental Studies resources page. These organizations hold certain standards within themselves; having history contributing to Sacramento, and to its neighboring cities. Organizations such as those in Sacramento specialize more on the land areas around the city; whereas some are more specific, such as the National Environment Trust which is a non-profit organization.

Various Organizations are at the public's disposal. Eleven organizations are just some of the many organizations that are around the nation, but these are mainly focused on those in the Sacramento region. They enable a road map as to how a person who lives in the Sacramento Area would like to get involved with Environmental discussions.

- Sacramento Organizations: - Organizations more locally focused around the city

American River Conservancy (ARC)
- The ARC finds themselves working on areas around the upper areas of both the American River, and the Cosumnes River's watersheds. They specialize in these areas, providing education for the communities around the areas listed, and enable stewardship from the public to help preserve the ecosystems. They hold many values within their organization, as they have been doing this for the past thirty years. One of their focuses in preservation is known to be the popular California Poppy, which is regionally specific to California. Many other values stated from the organization's about page consist of:

• Environmental Literacy

• Collaborative relationships with stakeholders

• Ecological and Cultural Diversity

• Restoration and preservation of Open Space + Biodiversity

• Stewardship

• Education

• Preservation

California Native Plant Society (CNPS)
- With over thirty-five chapters all across the state of California, the California Native Plant Society directs its attention to what they call California's "native flora".  The chapters are around the state's regions as stated:

• Bay Area & Peninsula

• Central Coast

• Desert and Eastern Sierra

• Foothills & Mountains

• North Coast & Wine Country

• Southern California & Baja

• Valley

• Special Interest Chapter

- Each chapter specializes in doing various works within each region as they each have their own types of plants which they hope to preserve and maintain for generations to come. The CNPS has specialized over the past fifty years in resuming their work as educators and learners about the plants around California. They work in preserving and understanding the one out of the third types of flora that are only found in California; but even then, are found rather rare to find and preserve.

- Within the Sacramento Region, it was the first chapter ever founded as part of this organization and has a large emphasis and focus on conservation and preservation with the plant types around the region.

Cosumnes River Preserve (CRP)
- Finding its origins in South Sacramento county in 1984, the Cosumnes River Preserve has dedicated its mission to secure preserved areas of around 46,000 acres of land. They aspire to continue preserving biodiversity and maintain all forms of life; ensuring that every endangered species is helped, and pursuing a level of encouragement to the people. They take any policies that are helpful for their goals and utilizing them to help alongside the many partners associated with this organization. They also use help from their partners to increase the amount of stewardship that is capable of happening right now.

- With over 690+ types of various verified species, the preserve is home to many forms of wildlife and encourages much of the best ways from the general public to help alleviate some of the stresses that the preserve becomes susceptible to.

Sacramento Audubon Society (SAS)
- Welcoming new members everyday, the Sacramento Audubon Society focuses on the preservation and conservation of the four-hundred species that are located on the many long routes that are associated with this region. Their mission(s) include:

• Protecting the lives of wildlife such as birds

• Creating outreach programs which influence the interest of the public communities in helping protect the birds

• Encouraging environmental education

• Providing versatile ways to help with the conservation of open space areas.

- Nonprofit Nonpartisan Organizations: Non-biased organizations that do not seek profit as their primary goal.

Environmental Council of Sacramento (ECOS) 
- The Environmental Council of Sacramento is a 501(c)(3) nonprofit organization that specializes in the region of Sacramento. With connections to local government officials, member organizations, and any individuals who want to work alongside this organization to present and hold sustainability to the environment, its residents and ecosystems. Their goals and objectives have been classified to be as following:

• Promote and reinforce Smart Growth principles

• Improve air quality and reduce greenhouse gas emissions to slow climate change

• Establish a regionally coordinated conservation strategy

• Establish a sustainable regional water supply for both ecological and municipal needs

• Achieve equity in housing, public health, and economic opportunity

Ever since their historic founding through bettering the stresses of public health, ECOS has established itself alongside its goals to better the air quality and sustainability of the lands around Sacramento, including a newly formed mission envisioning a source of transportation that is healthy and clean for the region of Sacramento.

National Environmental Trust (NET)
- This organization was first established in 1994 in Washington, D.C., and has kept a reputation in the nation as helping and maintaining information about contemporary works in the environment. Their current main website has been hacked, but hopefully soon it will be rebooted and taken back. They are recognized for their current works in the environmental field for keeping to date information on:

• Global Warming

• Environmental Health

• National Forests

• Marine Conservation

• Public Health Issues

These are their current works around the area of not only Sacramento; but because of their stance as an organization that focuses on these categories and more, they find themselves being part of a larger discussion that is presented on a national scale.

African American Environmentalist Association (AAEA)
- Being inclusive and educational; and founded in 1985, the African American Environmentalist Association's goals as a non-profit has found itself reaching out to African American communities and trying to get them more involved in environmental activities. They help inform communities about the environmental movement continuously going on around the nation. They also hold much of their work to be focused on the ways to protect animal and plant ecological environments.

- AAEA also finds itself combating the injustices and racism issues through the practice of environmental solutions. They importantly welcome all races that are interested in helping to become involved in their journey to improve African American Communities not just around Sacramento, but also those around the state.

References 

Sacramento
Organizations based in Sacramento, California